Tevita Mailau (born 25 April 1985 in Sydney, Australia) is a rugby union player who plays for Stade Montois in the Top 14 and Tonga internationally. He previously played for the Auckland Blues in Super Rugby and Auckland in the ITM Cup.

Career

Domestic Rugby
Mailau made his debut for Auckland in 2006 in a game against Fiji Warriors in Lautoka. The following season he spent a full year as a loan player with the Northland Taniwha playing all eleven games including two starts. His 2008 season was spent between both Northland and Auckland where he spent four weeks as a loan player before returning to Auckland.

2009 saw Mailau make his Super 14 debut for the Blues in their Round Two 59–26 loss to the Bulls in Pretoria. In 2012, after making 38 Blues appearances, he signed with Stade Montois of the Top 14.

Representative career
Mailau has the distinction of being able to play either loosehead or tighthead prop. He has represented New Zealand at both Secondary Schools and under 21 level. He made his international debut for Tonga in 2012.

Notes

External links 
 Blues player profile

New Zealand rugby union players
Blues (Super Rugby) players
Auckland rugby union players
Northland rugby union players
Rugby union props
Rugby union players from Auckland
1985 births
Living people
People educated at Wesley College, Auckland
Tonga international rugby union players
Australian emigrants to New Zealand
New Zealand sportspeople of Tongan descent
New Zealand expatriate rugby union players
Expatriate rugby union players in France
New Zealand expatriate sportspeople in France